The striped prinia (Prinia striata) or Swinhoe's prinia is a species of bird in the family Cisticolidae. It was formerly lumped with the Himalayan prinia (P. crinigera) as the striated prinia, but was split from it following a study published in 2019.

It is distributed throughout mainland China and Taiwan. It is sympatric with P. crinigera in the Yunnan Province of China.

There are three known subspecies: P. s. catharia, which ranges from northeast India through Myanmar to south-central China, P. s. parumstriata, which is distributed throughout southeast and central China, and P. s. striata, which is restricted to Taiwan.

References 

Prinia
Birds of China
Birds of Taiwan
Birds described in 1859